Bilger Run is a  long 2nd order tributary to Kratzer Run in Clearfield County, Pennsylvania and Kratzer Run's largest and only named tributary.  Its watershed accounts for nearly half of the greater Kratzer Run watershed.  This is the only stream of this name in the United States.  Bilger Run has an ID number of 1169617 from the US Board of Geographic Names.

Course 
Bilger Run rises about 2 miles southeast of Chestnut Grove, Pennsylvania, in an area of wetlands and then flows generally southeast to join Kratzer Run at Stronach.  It runs through areas that have been surfaced mined for coal in its upper reaches.

Watershed 
Bilger Run drains  of area, receives about 43.9 in/year of precipitation, has a wetness index of 407.40, and is about 68% forested.  Bilger Run is heavily loaded with metals from Acid Mine Drainage (AMD) and contributes a lot to the pollution load of Kratzer Run and then on into Anderson Creek.  No fish were found at the sampling station on Bilger Run.

Natural History 
Bilger Run drains parts of the Anderson Creek Montgomery Creek LCA and is also the location of Bilger Rocks BDA.  The LCA is noted for providing contiguous forested habitat for interior forest species, while the BDA provides habitat for a species of rare plant.

See also 
 List of Pennsylvania Rivers

References

Watershed Maps 

Rivers of Pennsylvania
Rivers of Clearfield County, Pennsylvania